Untold Story may refer to:

Untold Story (album), a 2004 album by The Game
Untold Story (novel), a 2011 novel by Monica Ali
"An Untold Story", an episode of Once Upon a Time
The Untold Story, a 1993 Hong Kong film
"The Untold Story", a 2020 song by Annie from Dark Hearts

See also

Untold Stories (disambiguation)
Untold (disambiguation)